Student Peace Action Network or SPAN is the student wing of Peace Action. [1] It is also a coordinating committee member of the National Youth and Student Peace Coalition (NYSPC). [2] SPAN works to end U.S. militarism, nuclear weapons, weapons trafficking, and “the complex webs of corporate and military power that perpetuate racism, damage the environment, deprive people of basic needs, and violate human rights.” [3]It currently has over 130 chapters and affiliates.

Current campaigns

Flunk The War Machine
SPAN’s currently organizes around its “Flunk the War Machine" Campaign. The campaign originally started in 2004 and focused on opposition to the Patriot Act on Campuses, the No Child Left Behind Act’s military recruitment provisions, university financial ties to weapons manufactures. The campaign also seeks to encourage the promotion of peaceful studies. The campaign has been expanded to include counter-recruitment in general and war profiters[4]

Books Not Bombs
As member of NYSPC, SPAN is also involved in the Books Not Bombs Campaign. The Books not Bombs Campaign calls for funding education as opposed to war along with an end to on-campus military recruitment.[5] The campaign has included congressional call-in days, petitions, student strikes, contingents in national protest. As part of the Books Not Bombs Campaign SPAN also took part in a National Youth Convergence held to counter 2004 Republican National Convention as well as participating in the wider protest at both the Republican and Democratic National Conventions.

History
Student Peace Action Network was formed in 1995. Originally called the Peace Action Campus Network, it officially became the Student Peace Action Network in 1996. Its earliest actions included a campaign for Human Rights in Mexico with a concentration on the crisis in Chiapas and also a campaign to close the School of Americas. 

SPAN was also active in the anti-globalization movement, offering nonviolence training for IMF/World Bank protesters, and organizing contingents in several IMF/World Bank protests. From 2000-2002, it participated in a joint march against both the IMF/World Bank and the then possibility of a US invasion of Iraq. 

In 2001 after the September 11th attacks in the US SPAN was at the forefront of leading the anti-war charge looking at the intersections of oppression and ways in which war most gravely effects brown, black, poor and woman. The SPAN youth activist saw the broad effects of war and violence at home and abroad.  A conference was held at the Claremont Colleges in Pamona CA which brought together a broad coalition of student leaders and youth organizers. The conference’s highlighted a panel of speakers who were survivors of the Hiroshima Nagasaki bombing as well as anti-racist trainings, direct action trainings, permaculture trainings and alternative to fossils fuel exhibits including; solar panel install information and a vegetable oil powered bus.   [6][7]

In the response to the War on Terror SPAN helped form the National Youth and Student Peace Coalition along with other prominent student groups. As a reaction to the George Bush’s plans to invade Iraq, SPAN organized teach-ins against the war on October 7, 2002. [8]

In 2003 SPAN organized and co-sponsored along with September 11th Families for Peaceful Tomorrows and the Japanese Congress against the A and H-Bombs the Survivors Speak: From Hiroshima to 9/11 Tour. The tour consisted of Andrew Rice whose brother was killed on 9/11 and Seiko Ikeda, a Hiroshima survivor speaking on the need for an end of the use of violence. The tour reached seven schools, including Harvard, Dartmouth, and the University of New Hampshire. [9]

In 2007 SPAN participated in the US Social Forum, organizing a workshop on counter-recruitment. SPAN also participates in the annual Think Outside the Bomb Youth Nuclear Issues Conference at the University of California, Santa Barbara. [10]

See also 
 Peace Action
 Campus Antiwar Network
 Counter-recruitment
 Student Peace Alliance

References 
 Student Peace Action Network About SPAN
 National Youth and Student Peace Coalition NYSPC Members

External links 
 Official Site
 National Youth and Student Peace Coalition
 Peace Action

Anti–nuclear weapons movement
Peace organizations based in the United States
Student political organizations in the United States